Lewis Jon Macari (born 8 February 2002) is a Scottish professional footballer who plays for Stoke City, as a defender.

Club career
Macari began his career with Stoke City, spending time on loan at Market Drayton Town, before moving on loan to Irish club Dundalk in February 2022. He returned to Stoke in May, before the loan deal was extended until November, being the end of Dundalk's season. He scored his first goal for the club in a 2–1 win over Finn Harps in October.

He made his debut for Stoke City on 8 January 2022, appearing as a late substitute in an FA Cup match against Hartlepool United.

International career
He made one appearance for Scotland under-18s in 2019.

Personal life
Macari comes form a sporting family, his father Paul, uncle Mike, and grandfather Lou, all played professional football.

Career statistics

References

2002 births
Living people
Scottish footballers
Stoke City F.C. players
Market Drayton Town F.C. players
Dundalk F.C. players
Northern Premier League players
League of Ireland players
Scotland youth international footballers
Scottish expatriate footballers
Scottish expatriates in Ireland
Expatriate association footballers in Ireland
Expatriate association footballers in the Republic of Ireland